Portan is a red French wine grape that is planted primarily in the Languedoc. The grape is a crossing of Grenache and Portugais, being breed with the aim of ripening more reliably than Grenache.

Synonyms
The only synonym of Portan is its breeding code E.M. 1508-25.

References

Red wine grape varieties